The Bahamas Championship is a preseason college basketball tournament, first held in 2021, in the inaugural tournament, Four of the top programs in college basketball next season then will compete in the “Baha Mar Hoops Bahamas Championship”

Champions

Brackets 
* – Denotes overtime period

2022

2021

References

External links
 Bahamar Hoops

College basketball competitions
Recurring sporting events established in 2021
Basketball in the Bahamas
Sports competitions in the Bahamas